Pasqualetti is a surname. Notable people with the surname include:

José Pasqualetti (born 1956), French football midfielder and manager
Martin J. Pasqualetti, professor of geography at Arizona State University